Jiao Liuyang (born August 6, 1991 in Harbin, Heilongjiang) is a female Chinese swimmer, who specializes in the 200-metre butterfly.

Career

She competed at the 2008 Summer Olympics and finished second in the 200 m butterfly in a time of 2:04.72, behind her teammate Liu Zige, who won the race in a time of 2:04.18.  Both swimmers swam faster than the former world record held by Australia's Jessicah Schipper (2:05.40).

Before the Olympics, Jiao had competed at the 2007 World Swimming Championships in Melbourne, where she placed 4th in the 200 m butterfly (2:07.22).  She had also won gold at the 2006 Asian Championships, setting a new championship record.

In 2009, she won two gold medals at the Asian Swimming Championships in the 50 m and 100 m butterfly, setting championship records in both events.  That year, the Chinese 4 x 100 m relay team also set a new world record time on the way to winning gold at the World Championships.  Individually, she also won a bronze medal in the 100 m butterfly.

She won three gold medals at the 2010 Asian Games, in the 100 m and 200 m butterfly, and as part of the Chinese 4 x 100 m medley relay team.  All three gold medals were won in times that were new Games records.  She went on to win gold at the 2011 World Championships, in the 200 m butterfly.

At the 2012 Summer Olympics, she went one place better, winning the 200 m butterfly in a time of 2:94.96, setting a new Olympic record.  She also competed in the 100 m butterfly, reaching the semifinal, and was part of the Chinese 4 x 100 m medley team.  Following the Olympics, she won two silver medals at the World Short Course Swimming Championships, in the 50 m butterfly and the 200 m butterfly.

Major achievements
2005 National Games - 2nd 200 m fly (2:10.31);
2006 Asian Championships - 1st 200 m fly (2:08.54)
2008 Olympics - 2nd 200 m fly (2:04.72)
2009 World Championships - 3rd 100 m fly (56.86)
2009 Asian Swimming Championships - 1st 50 m fly, 1st 100 m fly, 2nd 200 m fly
2010 Asian Games, 1st 100 m and 200 m butterfly, 1st 4 x 100 m medley relay
2011 World Aquatics Championships - 1st 200 m fly
2012 Summer Olympics - 1st 200 m Butterfly
2012 World Short Course Championships - 2nd 50 m butterfly and 200 m butterfly
2014 Asian Games - 1st 200 m butterfly

Records
2006 Asian Championships - (Tournament Record)

Personal Bests 
In long course
 50 m butterfly: 26.04 Asian, Chinese Record (April 11, 2009)
 100 m butterfly: 57.16 Asian, Chinese Record (April 10, 2009)

See also
China at the 2012 Summer Olympics - Swimming

References

External links 
 2008 Team China profile 
 
 
 
 
 

1991 births
Living people
Chinese female butterfly swimmers
Swimmers from Harbin
Olympic gold medalists for China
Olympic silver medalists for China
Olympic swimmers of China
Swimmers at the 2008 Summer Olympics
Swimmers at the 2012 Summer Olympics
World record holders in swimming
World Aquatics Championships medalists in swimming
Medalists at the FINA World Swimming Championships (25 m)
Asian Games medalists in swimming
Swimmers at the 2006 Asian Games
Swimmers at the 2010 Asian Games
Swimmers at the 2014 Asian Games
Medalists at the 2012 Summer Olympics
Medalists at the 2008 Summer Olympics
Olympic gold medalists in swimming
Olympic silver medalists in swimming
Asian Games gold medalists for China
Medalists at the 2010 Asian Games
Medalists at the 2014 Asian Games
21st-century Chinese women